"Let's Dance" is a song by Nikki Webster, released as the second single from her third album Let's Dance, released in 2004. It was written by Delta Goodrem, Mark Holden and Axel Breitung. It peaked at No. 37 on the ARIA Singles Chart in June 2004.

Music video
The music video for "Let's Dance" was directed by Paul Varolo and filmed at The McDonald College. It shows children following an arrow to 'Nikki Webster "Let's Dance" Audition' and rehearsing the dance routine with Webster. For the last 50 seconds of the video, a smaller group of dancers perform the routine in costume. A Current Affair ran a story and interview about Nikki shooting her new music video.

When Webster appeared on Video Hits to promote the single, she taught the dance to host Axle Whitehead, and on So Fresh to hosts Elysia Pratt and David Whitehill.

Live performances
Webster performed "Let's Dance" at the Australia Day Eve concert in Canberra, more than four months before the single's release. The performance is included on The Best of Nikki Webster DVD.

Webster also performed the song on Good Morning Australia on June 9, 2004.

Track listing
"Let's Dance" – 3:58
"Let's Dance" (karaoke mix) – 3:58
"Let's Dance" (video) – 3:58

Charts

References

2004 singles
Nikki Webster songs
Songs written by Mark Holden
Songs written by Delta Goodrem
Songs written by Axel Breitung
2004 songs
Songs about dancing